TNA Entertainment, LLC. v. Wittenstein and World Wrestling Entertainment, Inc. was a lawsuit filed on May 23, 2012 in Nashville, Tennessee by TNA Entertainment, LLC., against former employee Brian Wittenstein and World Wrestling Entertainment, Inc. (doing business as WWE). WWE and TNA were the two largest national professional wrestling promotions in the United States. The suit alleged that Wittenstein violated a non-disclosure agreement and shared confidential information with WWE which represented a comparative advantage in negotiating with wrestling talent under contract with TNA.

The lawsuit was formally withdrawn without prejudice, by the plaintiff, TNA, on January 15, 2013 under a "Notice of Voluntary Nonsuit" which offers no ruling on the merits of the suit and allows TNA to potentially refile at a later date.

Background
Brian Wittenstein signed a severance agreement with TNA, his former employer, on August 3, 2011 which included a non-disclosure agreement preventing him from disclosing certain confidential TNA information (including information regarding talent contracts). He was subsequently hired by WWE after which, TNA asserted that Wittenstein violated the agreement by downloading confidential TNA trade secrets and providing that information to WWE. Although WWE fired Wittenstein and alerted TNA officials as to the disclosure of the information, TNA claimed that WWE had access to the information for three weeks prior to disclosure and in this time, WWE used secret contract information and attempted to poach their talent in violation of Tennessee's Uniform Trade Secrets Act. The information was alleged to include data regarding wrestler compensation, which was used to recruit contracted TNA talent to work for WWE. One prominent wrestler named in the suit was Ric Flair, whom TNA claims asked for his release from the company in order to sign with WWE following Wittenstein's disclosure of information to WWE.

In TNA's suit, they stated:

See also
List of class-action lawsuits

References

Class action lawsuits
WWE
Impact Wrestling